Maryana Iskander (born September 1, 1975) is an Egyptian-born American social entrepreneur and lawyer. In 2022, she became the chief executive officer (CEO) of the Wikimedia Foundation, succeeding Katherine Maher. Iskander was the CEO of the Harambee Youth Employment Accelerator and a former chief operating officer of the Planned Parenthood Federation of America in New York.

Early life and education
Maryana Iskander was born in Cairo, Egypt, where she lived before emigrating to the United States with her family at the age of four. Her family settled in Round Rock, Texas. Iskander graduated from Rice University magna cum laude with a degree in sociology in 1997, before earning her MSc from Oxford University as a Rhodes Scholar in 1999, where she founded the Rhodes Association of Women. In 2003, she graduated from Yale Law School.

Career
After graduating from Oxford, Iskander began her career as an associate at McKinsey and Co. Following her graduation from Yale Law School, Iskander clerked for Diane P. Wood on the Seventh Circuit Court of Appeals in Chicago, Illinois. She then served as the adviser to the president of Rice University, David Leebron. After two years, Iskander left her job at Rice to take the role of chief operating officer for Planned Parenthood Federation of America in New York. She has also worked as a strategy consultant for W. L. Gore & Associates, and a law clerk at Cravath, Swaine & Moore in New York, and Vinson & Elkins in Houston.

After her time at Planned Parenthood, Iskander in 2012 became the chief operating officer of Harambee Youth Employment Accelerator in South Africa before becoming its chief executive officer (CEO) in 2013. Harambee is focused on connecting employers to first-time workers to reduce youth unemployment and increase retention. In 2015, Iskander made a commitment in New York City to the Clinton Global Initiative that Harambee would provide South African youth with 50,000 jobs and work experiences; by 2018, she was able to share with former U.S. President Bill Clinton, in Johannesburg for a visit, that Harambee had exceeded her commitment, delivering over 85,000 such opportunities. Speaking at the 2019 Conscious Companies Awards in Johannesburg, Iskander explained that she wanted "business to understand that the hiring of young people in their first jobs is not a charitable exercise but talent ... We treat young people like customers and not like beneficiaries." By building a large pool of workers that is easily navigable and proving that youth can be employed successfully using this method, Harambee was able to scale their efforts and effectiveness. During her time as CEO, the non-profit connected 100,000 young workers with work opportunities in partnership with 500 businesses as of June 2019.

On September 14, 2021, Iskander was named as CEO of the Wikimedia Foundation, assuming her post on January 5, 2022. She has stated in interviews that her priorities after taking her role were to diversify Wikipedia's volunteer writers and editors and to promote the Wikimedia Foundation's mission of advocating for access to information.

Recognition
Iskander has been the recipient of several awards and fellowships including the Skoll Award for Social Entrepreneurship and the Yale Law School Distinguished Alumnae Award. In 2002, she was awarded the Paul and Daisy Soros Fellowship for New Americans, which is given to immigrants or the children of immigrants "who are poised to make significant contributions to US society, culture or their academic field". She was awarded a Rhodes Scholarship and Harry S. Truman Scholarship. She was also a member of the 2006 class of Henry Crown Fellows at the Aspen Institute, and of their Aspen Global Leadership Network. Harambee Youth Employment Accelerator and its leadership have been recognized with awards and funding from organizations such as the Skoll Foundation and USAID.

See also
 List of Wikipedia people

References

External links
 Maryana Iskander's Commitment Announcement at the Clinton Global Initiative 2015 Annual Meeting

1975 births
21st-century American businesspeople
21st-century American businesswomen
21st-century American lawyers
21st-century American women lawyers
Alumni of the University of Oxford
Alumni of Trinity College, Oxford
American chief operating officers
American Rhodes Scholars
American social entrepreneurs
American women chief executives
Egyptian emigrants to the United States
Henry Crown Fellows
Living people
People associated with Planned Parenthood
People from Round Rock, Texas
Rice University alumni
Wikimedia Foundation staff members
Yale Law School alumni